Rough Riders of Durango is a 1951 American Western film directed by Fred C. Brannon and written by M. Coates Webster. The film stars Allan Lane, Walter Baldwin, Aline Towne, Steve Darrell, Ross Ford, and Denver Pyle. The film was released on January 30, 1951, by Republic Pictures.

Plot

Cast
Allan Lane as Rocky Lane 
Black Jack as Rocky's Stallion
Walter Baldwin as Cricket Adams
Aline Towne as Janis Adams
Steve Darrell as John Blake
Ross Ford as Sheriff Bill Walters
Denver Pyle as Henchman Lacey
Stuart Randall as Henchman Jed
Hal Price as Johnson
Tom London as Rancher Evans
Russ Whiteman as Jim Carter
Dale Van Sickel as Henchman Willis

References

External links 
 

1951 films
American Western (genre) films
1951 Western (genre) films
Republic Pictures films
Films directed by Fred C. Brannon
Films adapted into comics
American black-and-white films
1950s English-language films
1950s American films